Home is the fifth studio album by Irish band the Corrs. An Irish-themed album, it includes covers of old Irish songs and traditionals, but also covers of non-Irish songs such as "Heart Like a Wheel". It includes two tracks in Irish, "Buachaill Ón Éirne" and "Bríd Óg Ní Mháille"; and three instrumentals, "Old Hag (You Killed Me)", "Haste to the Wedding", and the bonus track "Return to Fingall". Home was compiled from a songbook of their deceased mother Jean Corr. The album was released exactly 10 years after the release of their first album Forgiven, Not Forgotten.

Although the Corrs returned to their Irish roots, the success of this album and its singles has been poor. "Old Town" performed poorly on the UK Singles Chart, peaking at number 43.

Critical reception

Mark Weisinger from PopMatters stated that "anyone who has been waiting since the original, unremixed version of Talk On Corners for the Corrs to abandon their pursuit of the American pop charts to deliver another record along the lines of Forgiven, Not Forgotten will finally find their waiting repaid handsomely." The decision to cover and release "Old Town" as a single was questioned, with Gareth Maher of CLUAS.com calling it "a disastrous one".

Track listing 
All songs are traditional, arranged by the Corrs, except where noted.

Charts and certifications

Weekly charts

Year-end charts

Certifications

References

The Corrs albums
2005 albums
Atlantic Records albums
Albums produced by Mitchell Froom